World's Fair is a 1985 novel by American author E.L. Doctorow. It is a semi-autobiographical story of a boy named Edgar who lives in the Bronx during the late 1930s, and culminates with the 1939 World's Fair. It won the National Book Award in 1986.

References

1985 novels